Holbeck is an inner city area in Leeds, West Yorkshire, England.

Holbeck may also refer to:
Holbeck, Lincolnshire, England, a hamlet in Ashby Puerorum parish
Holbeck, Nottinghamshire, England, a village and civil parish
Holbeck Ghyll, a restaurant located in Windermere, Cumbria, England
Holbeck Hall Hotel, a clifftop hotel in Scarborough, North Yorkshire, England
Holbæk, a town in Denmark
Holbeck TMD, a former railway depot located in Holbeck, Leeds
Holbeck, a settlement in the municipality of Teltow-Fläming of Germany

See also Houlbec-Cocherel, Houlbec-près-le-Gros-Theil, Normandy, France.